Smash Mouth is an American rock band from San Jose, California. The band was formed in 1994, and was originally composed of Steve Harwell (lead vocals), Kevin Coleman (drums), Greg Camp (guitar), and Paul De Lisle (bass). With Harwell's departure in 2021, De Lisle remains the only original member. They are known for their songs "Walkin' on the Sun" (1997), "All Star" (1999), and "Then The Morning Comes" (1999), as well as a cover of The Monkees' "I'm a Believer" (2001).

The band adopted retro styles covering several decades of popular music. They have also performed numerous covers of popular songs, including War's "Why Can't We Be Friends?", Rick Astley’s “Never Gonna Give You Up”, Simple Minds' "Don't You (Forget About Me)", ? & the Mysterians' "Can't Get Enough of You Baby", the Beatles' "Getting Better", Queen's "Under Pressure", House of Pain's "Jump Around", and "I Wan'na Be Like You" from The Jungle Book. They also composed two songs for the South Korean animated film Pororo, The Racing Adventure: "Beside Myself" and "Everything Just Crazy".

History

1990–1997: Formation and Fush Yu Mang
Smash Mouth's roots trace back to 1990 when Steve Harwell and Kevin Coleman met. Smash Mouth was then formed in 1994 by Harwell, who had formerly played in a rap group called F.O.S. (Freedom of Speech). Coleman, who was Harwell's manager, knew guitarist Greg Camp and bassist Paul De Lisle, who had both played in a local punk band, and introduced the three musicians to each other. They began rehearsing together, along with Kevin Coleman as drummer. They soon developed into a band, and named themselves Smashmouth, an American football term. During their early years, the band played largely rock music.

The band's first publicity came when a demo of the song "Nervous in the Alley" was played by a San Jose radio station, KOME. Soon after, Interscope Records signed the band, and the group's debut album, Fush Yu Mang, was released in 1997, featuring another member: the keyboardist Michael Klooster. Also, upon signing to Interscope Records, the band changed their name from Smashmouth to Smash Mouth. The album eventually went double platinum led by the band's first major single "Walkin' on the Sun". The singles "The Fonz" and a cover of "Why Can't We Be Friends" from the 1998 Kevin Bacon film Wild Things were also subsequently released.

1998–2004: Rise to fame, Astro Lounge, Smash Mouth, and Get the Picture?
The band's second album, Astro Lounge, was released in 1999 and marked a change in direction, as it had less of the previous ska influence and more of a pop sound. It led to more publicity for the band, and ended up being one of the most critically acclaimed albums from the group. Supported by the hit singles "All Star" (which was featured in several film soundtracks, most notably the first Shrek film although the official music video references Mystery Men) and "Then the Morning Comes", Astro Lounge was eventually certified as triple platinum.

Also in 1999, The East Bay Sessions was released as a collection of early songs.  Shortly after the release of the album, drummer Kevin Coleman left the band due to back problems.  He was initially replaced by Michael Urbano, who was quickly replaced by Mitch Marine for the tour supporting Astro Lounge, who was subsequently replaced by Michael Urbano at the conclusion of the tour.

In 2001, Smash Mouth covered the Monkees' hit song "I'm a Believer". It was featured on both the soundtrack for Shrek (along with "All Star") and their self-titled album. The album sold fewer copies than the band's earlier works, eventually being certified gold. Also in 2001, the group appeared as themselves in the climactic scene of the film Rat Race.

In 2003, Get the Picture? was released, featuring the singles "You Are My Number One", "Hang On" and "Always Gets Her Way". Smash Mouth was dropped from Interscope shortly after the release of Get the Picture?. That same year, the band performed a cover of the Sherman Brothers song "I Wanna Be Like You" for the animated film The Jungle Book 2.

2005–2011: New label, fluctuating lineup, Summer Girl, and Magic
Following the band's signing to Universal Records, Smash Mouth released the greatest hits compilation All Star Smash Hits in 2005. The album contains some more popular songs from previous Smash Mouth albums, as well as songs from soundtrack albums which were not on the band's own releases. On certain networks and time slots, the album was advertised as having 18 tracks, including an edited version of "Flo". Smash Mouth played at Gumby's Birthday Celebration in August 2005.

In December 2005, the band released a Christmas album Gift of Rock. It featured covers of Christmas songs by many artists, such as the Kinks and the Ramones, and one original song, "Baggage Claim".

Smash Mouth's fifth studio album, originally to be titled Old Habits, was recorded in 2005 and expected to be released in early 2006. The band had said that the album was much more like the ska punk featured on Fush Yu Mang and The East Bay Sessions. In September 2005, the band performed what was tentatively going to be the album's first single, "Getaway Car", on Last Call with Carson Daly. The album was delayed many times, in the hope of gaining publicity with Harwell's appearance on the reality show The Surreal Life. Smash Mouth returned to the studio intent on improving the record. Old Habits was shelved, replaced by Summer Girl, which included some remixed Old Habits tracks as well as new songs. After being delayed in much the same way Old Habits was for several months, the album was released on September 19, 2006. Smash Mouth let Sony Pictures use much of their music from Summer Girl and other songs for the movie Zoom, whose opening titles credit the film's music to the band.

Before the release of Summer Girl, drummer Michael Urbano left the band without warning on February 14, 2006 due to creative differences. He was initially replaced by former drummer Mitch Marine, and then by Jason Sutter, best known for his work with American Hi-Fi and the Rembrandts. The band released their new album, Summer Girl, later that year. In early 2007, one year after joining the band, Sutter left Smash Mouth to play drums for former Soundgarden and Audioslave frontman Chris Cornell; fill-in drummer Marine returned to Smash Mouth.

Greg Camp left the band in the summer of 2008. Smash Mouth recruited Leroy Miller to play guitar. Leroy left in 2009 and Camp returned to the band, but in 2011 Camp left once again and this time the band recruited Sean Hurwitz. Hurwitz stayed until 2012, and was replaced by Mike Krompass. Later in 2012, Hurwitz returned. In 2009 Mitch Marine left once again and was replaced by Urbano, who left again after only one year in 2010, and was replaced by Marine once again. Marine left yet again after a brief spell in 2010 and was replaced by Randy Cooke. Cooke was briefly replaced by Jason Sutter in 2011, then Charlie Paxson.

In June 2011, a writer at Something Awful offered $20 if the band's lead singer, Steve Harwell, would eat 24 eggs. Others on the site and on Twitter began offering additional sums, eventually targeted to various charities. In July 2011, Harwell accepted the challenge if fans could gather pledges of $10,000 for St. Jude Children's Hospital. The fundraising goal was reached in less than a week's time. A self-styled "reality TV fan," Harwell requested that his friend celebrity chef Guy Fieri prepare the eggs. The event was held at Johnny Garlic's restaurant, in Dublin, California, on October 11, 2011. With about 150 people attending, Harwell was able to finish the eggs with the help of audience members as well as the San Jose Sharks mascot, Sharkie. $15,000 was raised for charity.

2012–2019: Magic and live album
After parting ways with Universal Records and signing with 429 Records, Smash Mouth released their sixth studio album titled Magic, on September 4, 2012. The album was primarily produced by new band member Mike Krompass. The first single, also entitled "Magic", debuted on the Billboard Adult Contemporary chart at No. 22. The band spent the rest of 2012 touring behind the new project as well as promoting the release of their musical book of food recipes and things of the like — Recipes from the Road. Cooke left permanently toward the end of 2012, replaced by Paxson. In 2013 the band took part in the Under the Sun tour with Gin Blossom and Sugar Ray. Paxson left in July during the tour, and was initially going to be replaced by a returning Cooke; however, he was replaced by Sutter once again. Tod Burr, former drum tech of Def Leppard and drummer of Merle Jagger, came on board in 2012 as drum and keyboard tech of Smash Mouth.

On February 1, 2013, Smash Mouth headlined the AutoNation Coast to Coast rebranding event (which combined all AutoNation dealerships into a single brand) at Wayne Huizenga Park in Fort Lauderdale, Florida with Michela Paige from Season 3 of The Voice. The event also served as a final round in the AutoNation Culture of Caring Contest.

On October 6, 2014, Smash Mouth composed two songs for the English version of the South Korean animated film, Pororo, The Racing Adventure including "Beside Myself", and "Everything Just Crazy" which plays at the end credits.

On June 14, 2015, Smash Mouth was playing a set at the Taste of Fort Collins food festival in Fort Collins, Colorado, when singer Steve Harwell broke from his set and went into an angry three-minute, expletive-laden tirade, threatening to beat the audience members responsible for hitting him with bread. The band played the opening chords of "All Star" throughout a significant portion of Harwell's rant. The incident was covered by major media outlets, including TMZ, Gawker, and USA Today. Harwell later apologized for the incident in an interview with The Herald-Mail. Event organizer Jason Ornstein explained that he asked Harwell if he wanted him to have the DJs make an announcement instructing the crowd not to throw bread but according to Ornstein, Harwell "stormed on [stage] and took matters into his own hands". He continued "It wasn't like anyone was going to be getting hurt by throwing bread up in the air ... We just had to laugh at it, because he just really made a fool of himself."

In May 2016, Smash Mouth released their first live album titled Playlist: The Very Best of Smash Mouth through Sony Music. The recordings were harvested from shows in Rapid City, South Dakota and Manila.

2016 saw the band gain a new member in Sam Eigen and the return of Cooke. Eigen is a long-time friend of both Steve Harwell and Paul De Lisle, and has played with Alanis Morissette, Janet Jackson, and John Fogerty. He can also be heard playing guitar on several of Harwell's solo recordings over the years.

Greg Camp rejoined Smash Mouth in early 2018. An acoustic re-recording of Smash Mouth's first album, Fush Yu Mang, funded through PledgeMusic  was released in 2018 for the album's 20th anniversary.

On November 1, 2018, Smash Mouth released the single "Unity". It features hip-hop artists Kool Keith and Darryl McDaniels of Run-DMC. They then toured Australia in the same year during November to sell out crowds around the country, which consisted of a mix of theater, festival and pub shows. During the Arlie Beach Festival of Music in Queensland, Steve Harwell became ill and had to leave the stage. However, Nicky Bomba, Frankie J Holden, Wilbur Wilde from Melbourne Ska Orchestra and the remainder of Smash Mouth continued the set without him. Harwell recovered the next day and the Australian tour continued without any further incidents.

2020–present: Further projects and Harwell's departure

On August 8, 2020, the band performed at the 2020 Sturgis Rally and vocalist Harwell said things such as "fuck that COVID shit" during the performance. A report from the IZA Institute of Labor Economics later cited the event as being a superspreading event.

In October 2021, the band performed at The Big Sip beer and wine festival in Bethel, New York. Harwell appeared to be intoxicated, threatening audience members and performing what looked like a Nazi salute. Following the performance, Harwell announced his retirement due to ongoing health issues. Prior to Harwell's last show, the band was already performing with a substitute singer ostensibly filling in while Harwell dealt with his health issues.

In January 2022, it was announced upon Steve Harwell's departure, that the band has recruited new lead singer Zach Goode (formerly of Ghoulspoon, Divided By Zero and The Secret Seven). On March 2, 2022, the band released a cover of Rick Astley's song "Never Gonna Give You Up". Smash Mouth released a new single, "4th of July", on July 1, 2022.

Musical style

Earlier in their career, Smash Mouth was part of the ska punk scene. After the success of their single, "Walking on the Sun," the band began including more elements of psychedelic pop and other retro styles of the 1960s in their compositions. They would ultimately come to be known as a pop rock, power pop and alternative rock band, despite still retaining some elements of their ska and reggae roots.

Band members

Current members
 Paul De Lisle – bass, backing vocals (1994–present), lead vocals (touring 2016)
 Michael Klooster – keyboards, programming, backing vocals (touring 1997–2008; 2008–present)
 Randy Cooke – drums, percussion, backing vocals (2010–2011, 2011–2012, 2013, 2016–2018, 2018–present)
 Sean Hurwitz – guitar, backing vocals (2011–2012, 2012–2016, 2019–present)
 Zach Goode – lead vocals (touring 2021–2022; 2022–present)

Touring members
 Mark Cervantes – percussion, theremin, backing vocals (1999–2008, 2014, 2018)

Touring substitutes
 Rob Schwartz – guitar, backing vocals (2012)
 Kristian Attard – bass, backing vocals (2017)
 Danny Richardson – guitar (2018)
 Steve Carey – drums, percussion (2020)

Former members
 Steve Harwell – lead vocals, piano, occasional keyboards (1994–2021)
 Kevin Coleman – drums, percussion (1994–1999)
 Greg Camp – guitar, backing vocals; occasional keyboards and turntables (studio) (1994–2008, 2009–2011, 2014, 2018–2019)
 Michael Urbano – drums, percussion (1999, 2000–2006, 2009–2010, 2014, 2018)
 Mitch Marine – drums, percussion (1999–2000, 2006, 2007–2009, 2010)
 Jason Sutter – drums, percussion, backing vocals (2006–2007, 2011, 2013–2016)
 Leroy Miller – guitar, backing vocals (2008–2009)
 Charlie Paxson – drums, percussion, backing vocals (2011, 2012–2013)
 Mike Krompass – guitar, backing vocals (2012)
 Sam Eigen – guitar, backing vocals (2016–2018)

Touring guests
 Adam Young – lead vocals, guitar (2011)
 Miles Zuniga – guitar (2013)

Timeline

Discography

 Fush Yu Mang (1997)
 Astro Lounge (1999)
 Smash Mouth (2001)
 Get the Picture? (2003)
 The Gift of Rock (2005)
 Summer Girl (2006)
 Magic (2012)
 Fush Yu Mang (acoustic) (2018)

References

External links

 
Alternative rock groups from California
American pop rock music groups
American power pop groups
American ska punk musical groups
Musical quartets
Musical groups established in 1994
Musical groups from San Jose, California
429 Records artists